Markku is a given name. Notable people with the name include:

Markku Alén (born 1951), Finnish former rally and race car driver
Markku Aro (born 1950), Finnish singer who performed on Eurovision contest in 1971
Markku Huhtamo (born 1946), Finnish actor
Markku Into (born 1945), legend of Finnish poetry, member in Finnish 1960s underground movement of Turku
Markku Kanerva (born 1964), Finnish football manager and former player
Markku Kivinen (born 1951), professor of sociology and a director of the Aleksanteri Institute
Markku Komonen (born 1945), Finnish architect
Markku Koski (born 1981), professional snowboarder from Sievi, Finland
Markku Kukkoaho (born 1946), Finnish sprinter
Markku Kyllönen (born 1962), retired professional ice hockey player
Markku Lehmuskallio (born 1938), Finnish film director, cinematographer and screenwriter
Markku Luolajan-Mikkola, Finnish baroque cellist and viol player
Markku Niinimäki, Finnish Paralympian athlete competing mainly in category F54 shot put and javelin events
Markku Pölönen (born 1957), Finnish film director, screenwriter, editor, owner of film production company Suomen Filmiteollisuus
Markku Peltola (1956–2007), Finnish actor and musician
Markku Pusenius (born 1964), Finnish ski jumper who competed from 1981 to 1986
Markku Salminen (1946–2004), Finnish orienteering competitor
Markku Slawyk (born 1962), former field hockey player from West Germany
Markku Taskinen (born 1952), Finnish runner
Markku Toikka (born 1955), Finnish stand-up comedian and actor
Markku Tuokko (born 1951), retired Finnish discus thrower and shot putter
Markku Uusipaavalniemi (born 1966), Finnish curler and politician

Finnish masculine given names